NC4, NC-4 or similar may refer to:
Curtiss NC-4, an aircraft
North Carolina Highway 4, a state highway in eastern North Carolina 
Charlotte Route 4, a local road in Charlotte, North Carolina